Dale College Boys' High School (Simply often known as Dale College) is a public English medium high school for boys situated in the town of Qonce in the Eastern Cape province of South Africa; It is one of the few colleges in the Eastern Cape, it is one of the oldest schools in South Africa.

The King William's Town Public School was founded in 1861. It was renamed to Dale College in 1877, in honor of Sir Langham Dale, then Superintendent-General of Cape Province.

Captain Cecil D'Arcy of the Frontier Light Horse, who won the Victoria Cross in the Anglo-Zulu War in 1879, was an Old Dalian.

Notable alumni 
 Lonwabo Mtimka - Former SA under 19 rugby captain and radio rugby commentator 
List of matriculants at Dale College:
 Makhaya Ntini - South African professional cricket player
 Monde Zondeki - South African professional cricket player
 Tertius Myburgh - Journalist and editor, best known as editor of the Sunday Times between 1975 and 1990.
 Hylton Ackerman - First class cricket player
 Aphiwe Dyantyi - South African rugby union player
 Bjorn Basson - South Africa professional rugby player
 Keegan Daniel - South African professional rugby player
 Rabz Maxwane -  Rugby union player 
 Luke Smith (rugby union) - Rugby union player 
 Courtney Winnaar - Rugby union player 
 Aphelele Fassi - Rugby union player
 Sphu Msutwana - Rugby union player
 Bangi Kobese - South African professional rugby player
 John Spurgeon Henkel - Botanist and forester
 Mpho Pholo -  Record producer, Pianist and Composer

References

External links
 https://dalecollege.co.za/
 Old Dalians

High schools in South Africa
Schools in the Eastern Cape
Qonce
1861 establishments in the Cape Colony
Educational institutions established in 1861
Herbert Baker buildings and structures